The 1912–13 Army Cadets men's basketball team represented United States Military Academy during the 1912–13 college men's basketball season. The head coach was Harvey Higley, coaching his second season with the Cadets. The team captain was John VanVliet.

Schedule

|-

References

Army Black Knights men's basketball seasons
Army
Army Cadets Men's Basketball Team
Army Cadets Men's Basketball Team